Hellbound is the second studio album by American deathcore band Fit for an Autopsy. The album was released September 10, 2013 through eOne Music and was produced by the band's guitarist Will Putney.

Track listing

Personnel 
Credits adapted from album's liner notes.

Fit for an Autopsy
 Nate Johnson – lead vocals
 Pat Sheridan – guitars, backing vocals
 Will Putney – guitars, bass, production, engineering, mixing, mastering
 Tim Howley – guitars
 Josean Orta – drums

Additional musicians
 CJ McMahon of Thy Art Is Murder – guest vocals on "Still We Destroy"
 Nate Rebolledo of Xibalba – guest vocals on "Thank You Budd Dwyer"
 Brook Reeves of Impending Doom – guest vocals on "There Is Nothing Here Worth Keeping"
 Vincent Bennett of The Acacia Strain – guest vocals on "Children of the Corn Syrup"

Additional personnel
 Randy Leboeuf – editing
 Brian Mercer – artwork, layout
 Kevin Mercer – layout

Charts

References

External links 
 

2013 albums
Fit for an Autopsy albums